The Root of Evil is a 1912 American short silent film drama directed by D. W. Griffith and starring William J. Butler and Dorothy Bernard.

Cast
William J. Butler as the Wealthy Man
Dorothy Bernard as the Wealthy Man's Daughter
Edward Dillon as the Daughter's Husband
J. Jiquel Lanoe as the Secretary
Ynez Seabury as the Granddaughter
Harry Hyde
Alfred Paget as the Landlord
Charles Hill Mailes as the Doctor
John T. Dillon as the Lawyer

References

External links
The Root of Evil at IMDb.com

Films directed by D. W. Griffith
1912 short films
American silent short films
American black-and-white films
Silent American drama films
1912 drama films
1912 films
1910s American films
American drama short films